The Dexter Southfield School is an independent co-educational day school located in Brookline, Massachusetts, educating students from pre-kindergarten through twelfth grade. Dexter Southfield was founded in 1926 as the Dexter School.  In 2013 the Dexter School merged with the sister school Southfield School to form Dexter Southfield with which it had shared its campus since 1992.

History 
The Dexter School was founded in 1926 in response to the closure of the Noble & Greenough Lower School and lack of educational opportunities for boys in the Brookline area. The Dexter School opened on Freeman Street in the affluent Cottage Farm neighborhood educating boys through ninth grade. The school developed a strong bond with many of Boston's leading families with ties to the leading preparatory and Ivy League schools. In 1966, Dexter sold its campus on Freeman Street and moved to its present location on Mount Walley on Newton Street on the South Brookline/Jamaica Plain line. The school bought the property from the Catholic Foreign Mission Society of America who had resided on the site since 1945.  The property was the former estate of Anna Sears, who had built a Mediterranean Revival Style villa on the site in 1928. As Dexter expanded, the school continued the style of the white stucco façade and red terra-cotta roof of the Sears House. Today, the original house remains the central structure on campus and houses the Senior Lounge, Business Office and Admissions Office. In preparation for the school's move in 1966, the A building, Fiske Hall, and pool and gymnasium were built to the west of the Sears House. The Thorndike Hockey rink was added to the campus in 1973. From its long tradition as a boy's lower school, Dexter has undergone a vast transformation over the last 25 years. In the 1990s, further additions were made to the campus including the construction of the Mid-Rise and original lower school building. In 1992, the Southfield School was established on the same campus to expand Dexter's educational philosophy to young girls. In 2002, the Upper School was established to enable both the Dexter and Southfield schools to continue the school's mission into the competitive secondary school market. The Clay Center was also constructed to the east of the Sears House greatly altering the school campus. The new center included a new lecture hall, dining hall and fifth floor observatory. In 2011 Mr. and Mrs. William Phinney, who had led the school since 1964, and oversaw its move and expansion, retired after 47 years at the school. In 2013, the school was rededicated as the Dexter Southfield School, after receiving formal accreditation from the New England Association of Schools and Colleges (NEASC) Today, Dexter Southfield students offers single-sex classrooms in Pre-K through 8 and co-education in grades 9 through 12.

Campus 
The  campus on the Boston-Brookline border includes buildings such as Fiske Hall and the Sears Building grace the campus. Of particular note is the Clay Center for Science and Technology which provided students with classroom opportunities as well as an astronomical observatory.

Academics 
Dexter Southfield School's curriculum includes arts as painting, wood shop, choir, and much more. Beginning in Kindergarten 2, each homeroom does one public speaking event per year. Starting in sixth grade, every student takes Latin through eighth grade. When in seventh grade, each student takes Latin and a modern language. Every student in the seventh and eighth grades is required to take a language and all students take six classes in grade 8. In the high school, there are approximately fifteen AP courses offering anything from AP Physics to AP European History to AP Latin. There are also honors and normal level classes for most courses. There were many upper class electives in history, English, and science.

Athletics 
The Varsity Hockey team is year after year one of the strongest in New England competing against teams like Cushing, Nobles, Belmont Hill, Kimball Union, and Salisbury. Dexter's Varsity Tennis in 2012 was in NEPSAC Class A and beat teams like Phillips Andover and Phillips Exeter and advanced to the semifinals of the Class A tournament. The Varsity Hockey, Lacrosse, Tennis, Football, and Baseball teams have all had many athletes continue their careers at the Division 1 level of NCAA sports.

Upper school sport offerings

 Fall: Cross-country, football, soccer, volleyball
 Winter: hockey, squash, swimming, basketball, 
 Spring: golf, crew, tennis, lacrosse, baseball, track and field

Athletic Facilities
 Dalrymple Gymnasium (squash courts)
 Kraft Fieldhouse (ice rink, basketball courts, tennis courts, weight room, athletic training facility, indoor turf, locker rooms)
 Fuller Field (soccer, lacrosse)
 Cornish Field (football, field hockey)
 Charles River Boathouse (crew)
 Southfield, Farm Field (multipurpose)
 Lincoln Pool (swimming)
 Baseball field, softball field

Notable alumni
 John F. Kennedy, 35th President of the United States (1961–1963)
 Joseph P. Kennedy Jr. Brother of John F. Kennedy, Naval aviator during World War II; killed in action
 John W. Sears, American lawyer, historian and politician
 F. Warren McFarlan, Professor of Business Administration, Emeritus, at Harvard Business School
 Dmitri Nabokov, son of Vladimir Nabokov, opera singer and author
 Story Musgrave, Astronaut
 Ben Bradlee, Editor of The Washington Post
 McGeorge Bundy, United States National Security Advisor
 William Bundy, American attorney and intelligence expert
 Gaston Caperton, Governor of West Virginia, President of the College Board
 Ernie Adams, Director of Football Operations for the New England Patriots
 David Walton, actor
 Ryan Donato, ice hockey player for the Seattle Kraken
 Conor Garland, ice hockey player for the Vancouver Canucks
 Matthew Boldy, ice hockey player for the Minnesota Wild
 Jack Rathbone, ice hockey player for the Vancouver Canucks
 Joshua Baez, baseball player in St. Louis Cardinals organization

References

1926 establishments in Massachusetts
Defunct boys' schools in the United States
Educational institutions established in 1926
Private elementary schools in Massachusetts
Private high schools in Massachusetts
Private middle schools in Massachusetts
Schools in Norfolk County, Massachusetts